This page lists census-designated places (CDPs) in the U.S. state of Kentucky. As of 2022, there were a total of 135 census-designated places in Kentucky.

Census-Designated Places

References

See also
List of cities in Kentucky
List of counties in Kentucky

Census-designated places in Kentucky
Census-designated places
Kentucky